John Watt may refer to:

John Watt (politician) (1826–1897), Australian politician, member of the New South Wales Legislative Council
John Watt (physicist) (born 1932), Australian physicist
John Watt (cricketer) (1858–1914), Australian cricketer
John Alexander Watt (1868–1958), Australian geologist and mineralogist
John Charles Watt (1884–1961), Australian cricketer and son of the above cricketer
John Watt (broadcaster) (1901–1960), British broadcaster and producer
John Millar Watt (1895–1975), British painter, illustrator and comics artist
John Mitchell Watt (1892-1980) South African pharmacologist and author

See also
John Watts (disambiguation)
Jack Watt (disambiguation)